Otto Schneider may refer to:

 Otto Schneider (artist)
 Otto Schneider (SS officer)